Willy Spühler (31 January 1902, in Zurich – 31 May 1990) was a Swiss politician.

He was elected to the Swiss Federal Council on 17 December 1959, representing the Canton of Zürich, and handed over office on 31 January 1970. He was affiliated to the Social Democratic Party. He was a municipal councillor in Zurich in 1928 and a national councillor from 1938 to 1959. He was the first foreign minister to advocate Switzerland's membership of the United Nations in 1966. One week after de Gaulle's Vive le Quebéc libre!, Spühler delivered a speech on pluringual Switzerland during Montreal's Universal Exhibition in 1967 .

During his time in office he held the following departments:
Department of Posts and Railways (1960–1962), renamed Department of Transport, Communications and Energy (1963–1965)
Political Department (1966–1970)
He was President of the Confederation in 1963 and 1968. After retirement, he presided the Pro Helvetia Foundation and the consultative commission for Switzerland's presence abroad.

External links
 
 

1902 births
1990 deaths
Politicians from Zürich
Members of the Federal Council (Switzerland)
Social Democratic Party of Switzerland politicians
Recipients of the Order of Tomáš Garrigue Masaryk
Foreign ministers of Switzerland